Nimbus is a genus of scarab, stag and bess beetles in the subfamily Aphodiinae. There are about 13 described species in Nimbus.

Species
 Nimbus affinis (Panzer, 1823)
 Nimbus anyerae (Ruiz, 1998)
 Nimbus cartalinius (Olsoufieff, 1918)
 Nimbus contaminatus (Herbst, 1783)
 Nimbus franzinii (Pittino, 1978)
 Nimbus harpagonis (Reitter, 1890)
 Nimbus hoberlandti (Tesar, 1945)
 Nimbus johnsoni (Baraud, 1976)
 Nimbus libanonensis (Petrovitz, 1958)
 Nimbus marianii (Pittino, 1978)
 Nimbus obliteratus (Panzer, 1823)
 Nimbus proximus (Adam, 1994)
 Nimbus richardi (Veiga, 1984)

References

Scarabaeidae
Scarabaeidae genera